AppFolio is a company founded in 2006 that offers software-as-a-service (SaaS) applications for vertical markets. AppFolio primarily focuses on cloud-based property management software, services, and data analytics to the real estate industry. 
 
The company’s headquarters is in Goleta, California, in the Santa Barbara area.

History

AppFolio was established in 2006 by co-founders Klaus Schauser and Jon Walker. Schauser had previously founded Expertcity. 

The company’s first focus was property management for small to medium businesses and its first product, AppFolio Property Manager, was launched in 2007.

In November 2012, AppFolio acquired MyCase, a "legal practice management software provider."

AppFolio purchased real estate software firm RentLinx in April 2015. This acquisition included rights to the website ShowMeTheRent.com, which increased AppFolio’s listing presence.

In May 2015, AppFolio announced its IPO,  which was unveiled in June.

In September 2018, AppFolio reported acquisition of utility analytics software WegoWise. 

In January 2019, AppFolio acquired Dynasty Marketplace, Inc., for $60 million.

In September 2020, AppFolio announced the sale of MyCase to private equity firm Apax Funds, for approximately $193 million.

Products

AppFolio Property Manager 

A property technology solution with accounting, marketing, leasing, and management functionality for multifamily and single-family, commercial, student housing, community association, and mixed portfolio property managers. In June 2022 the company expanded the platform by launching AppFolio Stack, its integration marketplace.

AppFolio Investment Management 

A software platform designed for real estate investment management, with tools for fund management and syndication.

Awards 
In 2020, AppFolio ranked #1 in Fortune’s list of Fastest-Growing Companies. 

The same year, AppFolio was recognized as a Best Place to Work by Glassdoor.

References

External links
 

Property management
Software companies established in 2006
Software companies based in California
Companies based in Santa Barbara County, California
Cloud computing providers
Companies listed on the Nasdaq
2015 initial public offerings
Property management companies